Pholeoteras is a genus of gastropods belonging to the family Cyclophoridae.

The species of this genus are found in the Balkans.

Species:

Pholeoteras euthrix 
Pholeoteras olympios 
Pholeoteras zilchi

References

Cyclophoridae